Franz Pitschmann (born 16 December 1954 in Hall in Tirol) is an Austrian former wrestler who competed in the 1976 Summer Olympics, in the 1980 Summer Olympics, in the 1984 Summer Olympics, and in the 1988 Summer Olympics.

References

External links
 

1954 births
Living people
Austrian male sport wrestlers
Olympic wrestlers of Austria
Wrestlers at the 1976 Summer Olympics
Wrestlers at the 1980 Summer Olympics
Wrestlers at the 1984 Summer Olympics
Wrestlers at the 1988 Summer Olympics
People from Hall in Tirol
Sportspeople from Tyrol (state)